Luzarches station (French: Gare de Luzarches) is a railway station in the commune of Luzarches (Val-d'Oise department), France. The station is served by the Transilien H trains from Paris to Luzarches. The daily number of passengers was less than 500 in 2002. The station has a free parking lot with 83 places.

The first commercial run of the Z 50000 train (nicknamed Francilien) started from this station on Sunday 12 December 2009.

Bus connections

Busval d'Oise: 95.01 and 95.10
CIF: 46, 48, 50 and 121

Gallery

See also
List of SNCF stations in Île-de-France

References

External links

 

Railway stations in Val-d'Oise
Railway stations in France opened in 1880